The 1940 United States Senate election in Maryland was held on November 5, 1940.

Incumbent Democratic Senator George L. P. Radcliffe was re-elected to a second term in office, fending off an intra-party challenge from businessman Howard Bruce and easily winning the general election over Republican ex-Governor Harry Nice.

Democratic primary

Candidates
 Howard Bruce, Baltimore County industrialist
 Vincent L. Gierttoski
 George L. P. Radcliffe, incumbent Senator since 1935

Results

Republican primary

Candidates
 William Frederick Broening, former Mayor of Baltimore from 1919–23 and 1927–31
 Harry Nice, former Governor of Maryland from 1935 to 1939

Results

General election

Results

Results by county

Counties that flipped from Democrat to Republican
Dorchester
St. Mary's

Counties that flipped from Republican to Democrat
Allegany
Calvert
Carroll
Washington

See also
1940 United States Senate elections
1940 United States elections

References

Notes

1940
Maryland
United States Senate